Trelewis is a small village in the Taff Bargoed Valley of south-east Wales, currently located in the southern part of Merthyr Tydfil County Borough. It is a former mining village and together with nearby Bedlinog was until 1974 part of the Gelligaer Urban District Council area of the county of Glamorgan. The villages name means 'Lewis Town' and was named after the Lewis family who owned a farm on the area where the village is now built.

Location

Government
Trelewis is in the Merthyr Tydfil County Borough, which covers the villages of Trelewis and Bedlinog. The Bedlinog & Trelewis Ward is the only electoral area within the Merthyr Tydfil County Borough Council area with a Community Council. The Council was created in 1974 by the former Gelligaer Urban District Council prior to its abolition and the subsequent transfer of Trelewis and Bedlinog into the Merthyr administrative area upon local government reorganisation in that year, to which most people in Bedlinog and Trelewis were opposed.

History and amenities
During the latter nineteenth century, a coal mine opened in the village which led to a large expansion of the village. In 1878 the Trelewis school opened, this was replaced in 1984 with a new modern school.
There is a freight-only railway line, the Taff Bargoed branch of the former Great Western Railway, running through the village and this line carries coal from Ffos-y-fran opencast colliery. Bedlinog is to the north of Trelewis on this line, whilst Nelson is to the south.

Trelewis Welfare, a former member of the Welsh Football League, played in the village. Trelewis also has a park and an outdoor bowls club, Trelewis Welfare Outdoor Bowls which was founded in 1932, and following the closure of Treharris Bowling Club, merged in 2017 to form Trelewis & Treharris Welfare Outdoor Bowls Club.

Location grid

References

External links
Old Merthyr Tydfil: Trelewis - Historical Photographs of Trelewis.
www.geograph.co.uk : photos of Trelewis and surrounding area
www.alangeorge.co.uk : history and photographs of Trelewis

Villages in Merthyr Tydfil County Borough